Roccaforte del Greco (Calabrian ) is a comune (municipality) in the Metropolitan City of Reggio Calabria in the Italian region Calabria, located about  southwest of Catanzaro and about  southeast of Reggio Calabria.

Roccaforte del Greco borders the following municipalities: Bagaladi, Cardeto, Condofuri, Reggio Calabria, Roghudi, San Lorenzo, Santo Stefano in Aspromonte, Scilla, Sinopoli.

References

External links

 Official website

Cities and towns in Calabria